Khazovo (Kaz) is a rural locality (a village) in Kochyovskoye Rural Settlement, Kochyovsky District, Perm Krai, Russia. The population was 90 as of 2010. There are 4 streets.

Geography 
Khazovo is located 9 km southwest of Kochyovo (the district's administrative centre) by road. Durovo is the nearest rural locality.

References 

Rural localities in Kochyovsky District